The 2010–11 Southern Conference men's basketball season featured twelve teams competing in two divisions for regular season and tournament titles.  Both divisions ended in a tie for the division lead, with the North being shared between Chattanooga and Western Carolina and the South claimed by both College of Charleston and Wofford.  Wofford claimed the 2011 Southern Conference men's basketball tournament championship.

Awards

Player of the Year
Andrew Goudelock, College of Charleston

Defensive of the Year
Richie Gordon, Western Carolina

Freshman of the Year
Trey Simler, Western Carolina

Coach of the Year
Bobby Cremins, College of Charleston

All Conference Team
Omar Carter, Appalachian State
Donald Sims, Appalachian State
Andrew Goudelock, College of Charleston
Donavan Monroe, College of Charleston
Cameron Wells, The Citadel
Chris Long, Elon
Amu Saaka, Furman
Omar Wattad, Chattanooga
Mike Williams, Western Carolina
Noah Dahlman, Wofford

All Freshman Team
Trent Wiedeman, College of Charleston
Lucas Troutman, Elon
Eric Ferguson, Georgia Southern
Trevis Simpson, UNCG
Trey Sumler, Western Carolina

References